Jean-Claude Thibaut (born October 3, 1968) is a French filmmaker and producer, known for his bold and dark stylish films.
Thibaut, as a filmmaker, explores and defines his particular fascination with men and women, but also examines his wider response to people, places, history and situations. His style combines chic seduction with sexual shock-tactics, embracing twists on traditional glamour frequently portrayed in his portraits of beautiful, talented and notorious  public figures.

Jean-Claude Thibaut has directed Jon Hamm, Catherine Zeta-Jones, Sophie Marceau and Naomi Campbell among others  …Thibaut collaborates with Estee Lauder, Chanel, Dior  and Louis Vuitton.

Thibaut received the 2004 Philips Morris award « 400 Copies in Theater » for his short film about a robot-cop fly in Lethal Wings, underlined by one of the earliest Alexandre Desplat soundtracks, which in turn also received the Audience Award in Beauvais and participated in more than 70 festivals around the world including Los Angeles Film Festival and the Chicago International Film Festival. In 2012 The Peninsula Hotels campaign “Peninsula Moments”, written by Thibaut received the 2012 Bronze Excellence in Branded Content Award, tailing Disney and HSBC.

Jean-Claude Thibaut is well known for his successful brand contents campaign for Louis Vuitton, a film series on cities Los Angeles and Hong Kong using gender as a lens to interpret each city’s identity, introducing young rising stars as Ethan Peck, Grace Huang and Cosmo Wolski and Rosey Chan. In 2011 Thibaut co-produced For Lovers Only, rated top romance Indie film in iTunes USA in 2012, directed by Michael Polish with Stana Katic Castle (TV series).

Early life and career

Thibaut was born on October 3, 1968, in Annecy, Haute-Savoie, France, the son of Nicole Thibaut (born Bacou), a neonatal nurse, and Paul Thibaut, a war veteran doctor, one of the first homeopathic practitioners in France.

Thibaut began making movies at age eight with a super 8 camera. He studied animation at the AAA (Annecy Animation Association) and received his Baccalaureate diploma in 1989, leaving his hometown to study at The University of California, San Diego (UCSD) in 1991. Thibaut eschewed the film school route, and created a VFX company Explorer Films in Paris, worked on a multitude of TV commercials, including Jan Kounen's Dobermann (film)  with Vincent Cassel and Monica Bellucci amongst others.

In 1996 he becomes director of photography on dark humor feature film comedies, most notably Philippe Haim’s Barracuda  with Jean Rochefort and -first time on screen - Guillaume Canet. He also served as director of photography on Albert Dupontel’s Le Createur and James Huth’s Serial Lover. In 2000, Thibaut ends his career as a director of photography and begins work as film director after serving as a second unit DP on Doug Liman’s Blockbuster The Bourne Identity (principal photography by Oliver Wood  and Don Burgess.

After his second short film South, the story of a musician with his home studio build in a huge tree, the original soundtrack composed by Philippe Cohen Solal, leader of Gotan Project, Thibaut started to direct commercial with a first Armani project in 2001 for Partizan Entertainment and l’Oréal luxury division.

He joined Ridley Scott Associates, which represent him in the commercial international market from 2011 to 2019.

Jean-Claude Thibaut founded Armored, a director-driven production company based in LA, NYC and Paris.

Armored 
Set on a directing career, Thibaut formed a creative production company Armored in Paris and LA and started off directing documentary, branded content film, music video and TV commercials for Louis Vuitton, Dior, Hermes, Lanvin, Rick Owens, Vogue Italia, Miu Miu, Dolce & Gabbana and Armani.  In 2010, Thibaut produced a series of fashion films: Megan Fox's The Tip  and Cristiano Ronaldo's Housekeeping directed by Johan Renck for Armani Jeans with a first 5 million views in a week. The films were released in Cinema worldwide. Thibaut took a new direction with storytelling with the co-production of For Lovers Only directed by Michael Polish.

Filmography

Short films 
 Lethal Wings (1994) - Director
 South (2001) - Director
 Anytime Soon (2010) - Director
Two Missing Hourds (2020) - Director

Feature films 
 For Lovers Only (2010) - Producer
Brainious (2018) - Co-producer

Fashion Films 
 Megan Fox's "The Tip" (2011) - Producer
 '"When L.A. is a Man" for Louis Vuitton (2012) - Director
 "When Hong Kong is a Woman" for Louis Vuitton (2012) - Director

Awards and nominations

References

External links
 
 Peninsula Moments Campaign
 Megan Fox in "The Tip" for Giorgio Armani
 Cristiano Ronaldo in "Housekeeping" for Giorgio Armani
 AdvancedRoom a creative production company for Art and luxury industries, working in-house.
 Jean-Claude Thibaut  Film director
 Partizan Entertainment

1968 births
Living people
French film directors